Mandalay is a neighbourhood located within the Mitchells Plain urban area of the City of Cape Town in the Western Cape province of South Africa. It is located in the north eastern most corner of the Mitchells Plain area. 

Educational institutions in the neighbourhood include: 
 Mandalay Primary School

References 

Suburbs of Cape Town